Deputy Chief Minister of West Bengal is the deputy head of Government of West Bengal. The seat is now vacant since 5 November 2000 after former deputy chief minister Buddhadeb Bhattacharjee. In today's current government, there is no deputy chief minister in West Bengal.

List

References

Deputy chief ministers of West Bengal
West Bengal
West Bengal-related lists